Ichoca is a location in the La Paz Department in Bolivia. It is the seat of the Ichoca Municipality, the fifth municipal section of the Inquisivi Province.

References 

Populated places in La Paz Department (Bolivia)